Mee Bandung Muar, or simply mee bandung, is a traditional Malaysian cuisine which originated in Muar, Johor, Malaysia.

The word bandung in its name is derived from the literal meaning of the word in the Malay language, which means "mixture", "combined", "coupled", "doubles" or "pairs", as is illustrated in several Malay words like Sirap bandung (rose syrup beverage mixed with condensed milk) and Rumah berbandung (semi-detached or duplex house). Meanwhile the district of Muar is commonly and widely known to be the origin place of Mee Bandung.

Mee bandung is a cuisine that was originally cooked with yellow noodles coupled with egg in addition to a thick broth-gravy made of a combination of dried shrimps, onion, spices, shrimp paste and chilies. Then the dish was upgraded by adding prawn, meat, fish cakes and vegetables. Special variants were then created with the additional ingredient of giant freshwater prawn, lobster or even cattle's thighbone, which is fondly dubbed as Gear Box.

It has since became a much-loved dish that is available throughout Malaysia including neighbouring Singapore, although the original and authentic version served in Muar district is still considered the best. It was even reported to be a favourite of the Johor's Sultan Ibrahim Ismail, former Singapore's President S R Nathan and international celebrity chef-cum-restaurateur Chef Wan.

Mee bandung must not be mistaken as a dish linked to or originating from Bandung, Indonesia, because they are not related at all despite similarity in the names.

Gallery

See also 
 Bandung (drink)
 Mee rebus
 List of Malaysian dishes
 Malaysian cuisine

References

External links 
 Mee Bandung Muar: A Homemade Recipe: How To Make Mee Bandung Muar: History of Mee Bandung Muar
 Mee Bandung recipe - in Malay

Malay cuisine
Malaysian noodle dishes
Noodle soups
Shrimp dishes
Muar District